FWO may refer to:

 Fair Work Ombudsman, an agency of the Government of Australia
 Frontier Works Organization, a staff corps of the Pakistan Army
 Research Foundation – Flanders (FWO), a Dutch-speaking successor to the Belgian National Fund for Scientific Research
 Fort Worth Opera, professional opera company based in Texas, USA